Boote is an English surname. Notable people with the surname include:

 George Boote (1878–1930), English football goalkeeper
 Henry Ernest Boote (1865–1949), Australian editor, journalist, poet, and writer
 Rosie Boote (1878–1958), Irish Gaiety Girl and marchioness

English-language surnames